Tenorio Rock is a rock 0.4 nautical miles (0.7 km) offshore in western Discovery Bay, Greenwich Island, South Shetland Islands. The name derives from the forms "Islote Tenorio" and "Islote Aviador Tenorio" used on Chilean hydrographic charts of the 1950s. Humbert Tenorio Island was second pilot of the Sikorsky helicopter employed by the Chilean Antarctic Expedition of 1947.

Rock formations of Antarctica